Berta Ortegosa (1920–2010) was an Argentine actress. She starred in films such as Historia de una mala mujer (1947), Albéniz (1947), Don Juan Tenorio (1949), Hombres a precio (1949), Catita es una dama  (1956), La casa del ángel  (1957) (in which she played a mother "obsessed with her daughters' virginity"), Setenta veces siete (1962), Mujeres perdidas  (1964) and Boquitas pintadas (1974).
Ortegosa was known for her dramatic roles, and was a frequent collaborator with director Leopoldo Torre Nilsson. She was married to the actor Luis Corradi.

References

1920 births
2010 deaths
Argentine film actresses